Guardiola is a genus of plants in the family Asteraceae, native to Mexico and the southwestern United States.  Members of the genus are subshrubs with simple, opposite leaves and terminal inflorescences.

Originally placed in the subtribe Melampodiinae, the genus was placed in its own subtribe, Guardiolinae, by Harold Robinson in 1978.

 Species
 Guardiola angustifolia (A.Gray ex A.Gray) B.L.Rob. - Jalisco
 Guardiola arguta B.L.Rob. - Sonora
 Guardiola carinata B.L.Rob. - Nayarit
 †Guardiola diehlii M.E.Jones - New Mexico but probably extinct
 Guardiola mexicana Humb. & Bonpl. - from Durango to Oaxaca
 Guardiola odontophylla B.L.Rob. -  Durango
 Guardiola palmeri B.L.Rob. -  Durango
 Guardiola pappifera Paul G.Wilson - Guerrero
 Guardiola platyphylla A.Gray - Arizona (Gila, Pima, Santa Cruz, Cochise Counties), Sonora, Sinaloa, Chihuahua
 Guardiola rosei B.L.Rob. - Chihuahua, Nayarit, Durango
 Guardiola rotundifolia B.L.Rob. - Jalisco
 Guardiola stenodonta S.F.Blake - Sinaloa
 Guardiola thompsonii P.Van Faasen - Michoacán
 Guardiola tulocarpus A.Gray - from Sinaloa + Veracruz to Oaxaca

References

Asteraceae genera
 
Millerieae
Flora of North America
Taxa named by Aimé Bonpland